Paramjeet Singh Pammi is an Indian politician from the Bharatiya Janata Party and a  member of the Himachal Pradesh Legislative Assembly representing the Doon assembly constituency of Himachal Pradesh.

References

Year of birth missing (living people)
Living people
Bharatiya Janata Party politicians from Himachal Pradesh
Place of birth missing (living people)